The men's individual recurve competition at the 2009 World Archery Championships took place on 4–9 September 2009 in Ulsan, South Korea. 116 archers entered the competition, with one withdrawal before the qualification round on 4 September. As there were fewer than 128 entrants, all archers qualified for the 7-round knockout round on 6 September which was drawn according to their qualification round scores. The semi-finals and finals then took place on 9 September.

The final was an all-Korean affair, with second seed Lee Chang-hwan defeating Im Dong-hyun by five points. It marked the last World Archery Championships in which 12 arrow shoot-offs were used for the individual recurve competition elimination rounds; from 2011 the Olympic Round scoring system was adopted.

In the qualification round, first seed Oh Jin-hyek set a new world record of 1386. Oh Kyo-moon's record score of 1379 had stood since 2000.

Seeds
The top 13 qualifiers received byes to the second round.

Draw

Top Half

Section 1

Section 2

Section 3

Section 4

Bottom Half

Section 5

Section 6

Section 7

Section 8

Finals

References

2009 World Archery Championships